The Irish Free State Constitution Act 1922 (Session 2) was an Act of the Parliament of the United Kingdom, passed in 1922 to enact in UK law the Constitution of the Irish Free State, and to ratify the 1921 Anglo-Irish Treaty formally.

Provisions

As originally enacted, the Irish Free State Constitution Act 1922 consisted of a preamble, five sections (three of which were very brief), and a schedule. The schedule was the text of the Constitution of the Irish Free State (Saorstát Éireann) Act 1922, which had been passed in Ireland by the Third Dáil sitting as a constituent assembly and provisional parliament for the nascent Free State. This Irish Act itself had two schedules, the first being the actual text of the Constitution, and the second the text of the 1921 Treaty (formally, the Articles of Agreement for a treaty between Great Britain and Ireland). The UK Act's preamble quotes section 2 of the Irish Act:

Section 1 declared the scheduled Constitution would come into effect upon a royal proclamation no later than 6 December 1922.

Section 2 made transitory provisions regarding taxation liabilities

Section 3 empowered the Free State parliament to adopt legislation applied to other dominions

Section 4 was a saver empowering the UK Parliament to pass laws for the Free State on the same basis as for other dominions

Section 5 assigned the short title and specified that the Treaty to have been ratified. Article 12 of the Treaty accorded to Northern Ireland the right to secede from the new Free State and rejoin the United Kingdom, giving its parliament a month in which to decide: the so-called Ulster Month. The Treaty had been implicitly accepted by the UK parliament in votes on the King's Speech in December 1921, and most of its provisions had been effected in March 1922 by the Irish Free State (Agreement) Act 1922. However, neither of these events was held to have formally ratified the treaty. This was because the Ulster Month would begin as soon as the treaty had been ratified, and it was felt that the opt-out should not be exercised until after the Free State had come into being. Section 5 of the Irish Free State Constitution Act therefore declared the Act to be the ratification of the treaty for the purposes of the Ulster Month.

Enactment

The Irish Act had been approved by the Irish constituent assembly on 25 October 1922. The bill for the UK Act was introduced by the Prime Minister Bonar Law into the Parliament of the United Kingdom in November 1922. The bill's third reading in the House of Commons was on 30 November.

The New York Times reported on the passing of the Act on 5 December 1922 as follows:

The New York Times also reported that in Parliament a group of Communists singing "The Red Flag" caused a minor disturbance as the formalities relating to the Act's passage were underway.

Northern Ireland secedes from the Irish Free State

On 7 December 1922, the day after the establishment of the Irish Free State, the Parliament of Northern Ireland addressed the King requesting its secession from Irish Free State. The address was unanimous, with the abstentionist Nationalist and Sinn Féin members absent. The King replied shortly thereafter to say that he had caused his Ministers and the Government of the Irish Free State to be informed that Northern Ireland was to do so.

Position in Irish law

After the Statute of Westminster 1931, the UK government recognised the right of the Irish government to amend or repeal the UK act, but in fact the Irish government did not do so until it was formally repealed as spent by the Statute Law Revision Act 2007. The Irish government amended the Irish act in 1933, and the 1937 constitution repealed the entire Free State constitution. The UK Judicial Committee of the Privy Council ruled in 1935 that the 1933 Act had implicitly amended the UK Act with respect to the jurisdiction of the Free State.  The Irish Supreme Court has taken the view that the Free State constitution was enacted by the Irish Act, not by the subsequent UK Act. This reflects the view of popular sovereignty rather than parliamentary sovereignty, with the constitution's legitimacy ultimately springing from the 1922 Irish election.

References

Hansard
 HC Deb vol 159: Ordered 27 Nov 1922 cc294-7; Second Reading 27 Nov 1922 cc327-87; Committee 28 Nov 1922 cc537-67; Third Reading 29 Nov 1922 cc741-74; from Lords 4 Dec 1922 c1210
 HL Deb vol 52: First Reading 29 Nov c105; Second Reading 30 Nov 1922 cc108-72; Committee 1 Dec 1922 cc173-88; Third Reading 4 Dec 1922 cc211-36

1922 in law
United Kingdom Acts of Parliament 1922
British constitutional laws concerning Ireland
Political history of Ireland
1922 in British politics
1922 in Ireland
1922 in international relations
December 1922 events
Acts of the Parliament of the United Kingdom concerning Ireland
Independence acts in the Parliament of the United Kingdom
Irish Free State
Constitution of the Irish Free State
Ireland and the Commonwealth of Nations
Bonar Law